Nanur District is a district (bakhsh) in Baneh County, Kurdistan Province, Iran. At the 2006 census, its population was 9,345, in 1,651 families.  The District has one city: Buin-e Sofla.  The District has two rural districts (dehestan): Buin Rural District and Nanur Rural District.

References 

Baneh County
Districts of Kurdistan Province